Richard Eastham (born Dickinson Swift Eastham; June 22, 1916 – July 10, 2005) was an American actor of stage, film, and television, a concert singer known for his deep baritone voice, and an inventor.

Early years 
Eastham's birth name was chosen in honor of Miss Helen Dickinson Swift, one of his mother's college classmates. He is the son of Mr. and Mrs. Ernest K. Eastham, and he attended Soldan High School. Prior to serving in the Army during World War II, he was a student at Washington University in St. Louis, where he sang with the St. Louis Grand Opera.

Career 
On Broadway, Eastham was the understudy for Ezio Pinza as "Emile DeBecque" in South Pacific, eventually replacing Pinza on stage. His performance was so well received that he was made the male lead for a two-year national tour of the musical. His other Broadway plays included Medea and Call Me Madam. Eastham and co-star Janet Blair, in their original roles, headed another tour of South Pacific in 1965. In 1981 he appeared as Wesley Northridge on "The Waltons" The Lumberjack (TV Episode 1981)

Prompted by his playing of a guitar in The Sound of Music, Eastham invented the "Sidewinder", a mechanical device that attaches to the tuning gears and assists restringing a guitar. 31,000 "Sidewinders" were sold in the first three weeks they were publicly available.

Personal life
Eastham married Betty Jean Van Allen, who was his high school classmate.  On July 10, 2005, he died of Alzheimer's disease at an assisted-living facility in Pacific Palisades.

Filmography

References

External links
 

 (as Dickinson Eastham)

1916 births
2005 deaths
Male actors from Louisiana
American baritones
American male stage actors
American male film actors
American male television actors
Deaths from dementia in California
Deaths from Alzheimer's disease
People from Opelousas, Louisiana
United States Army personnel of World War II
United States Army soldiers
20th-century American male actors
Western (genre) television actors
20th-century American singers
20th-century American male singers
Washington University in St. Louis alumni